This list of Ramsar sites in Estonia includes wetlands that are considered to be of international importance under the Ramsar Convention. Estonia currently has 17 sites designated as "Wetlands of International Importance".

For a full list of all Ramsar sites worldwide, see List of Ramsar wetlands of international importance.



List of Ramsar sites

See also
 List of Ramsar wetlands of international importance
 Protected areas of Estonia
 List of protected areas of Estonia

Notes

References

External links
 EELIS: Estonian Nature Information System
 Estonian Environmental Registry
 The Estonian Ramsar sites
 Ramsari (1971) Konventsioon Rahvusvaheliste Märgalade Kohta, Eriti Veelindude Elupaikadena

Nature reserves
Estonia

Estonia
Ramsar sites